855 Newcombia (prov. designation:  or ) is a stony background asteroid from the inner regions of the asteroid belt. It was discovered on 3 April 1916, by astronomer Sergey Belyavsky at the Simeiz Observatory on the Crimean peninsula. It was named after Canadian–American astronomer Simon Newcomb (1835–1909).

Orbit and classification 

Newcombia is a non-family asteroid of the main belt's background population when applying the hierarchical clustering method to its proper orbital elements. It orbits the Sun in the inner main-belt at a distance of 1.9–2.8 AU once every 3 years and 8 months (1,326 days; semi-major axis of 2.36 AU). Its orbit has an eccentricity of 0.18 and an inclination of 11° with respect to the ecliptic.

Discovery 

Newcombia was discovered by Soviet-Russian astronomer Sergey Belyavsky at the Simeiz Observatory on the Crimean peninsula on 3 April 1916. The body's observation arc begins three weeks later, with its independent discovery by Max Wolf at Heidelberg Observatory on 28 April 2016. The Minor Planet Center, however, only credits the first discoverer.

Naming 

This minor planet was named after Simon Newcomb (1835–1909), a Canadian–American professor of astronomy and director of the U.S. Nautical Almanac Office at the United States Naval Observatory. He worked on cometary and planetary orbits and is known for his Tables of the Motion of the Earth on its Axis and Around the Sun, a mathematical development of the position of the Earth in the Solar System. Newcomb also measured the speed of light and revised the astronomical unit. The  was mentioned in The Names of the Minor Planets by Paul Herget in 1955. The lunar crater Newcomb as well as the Martian crater Newcomb were also named in his honor.

Physical characteristics 

In the SDSS-based taxonomy, Newcombia is a common, stony S-type asteroid.

Rotation period 

In October 2004, a rotational lightcurve of Newcombia was obtained from photometric observations by American amateur astronomer Walter R. Cooney Jr. in collaboration with John Gross, Dirk Terrell, Vishnu Reddy and Ron Dyvig. Lightcurve analysis gave a well-defined rotation period of  hours with a brightness variation of  magnitude.

An identical period of  hours with an amplitude of  magnitude was determined in April 2014, by Daniel Klinglesmith and colleagues at the Etscorn Observatory  in New Mexico.

Diameter and albedo 

The Collaborative Asteroid Lightcurve Link assumes a standard albedo for a stony asteroid of 0.20 and calculates a diameter of 13.58 kilometers based on an absolute magnitude of 11.7.

Notes

References

External links 
 Lightcurve Database Query (LCDB), at www.minorplanet.info
 Dictionary of Minor Planet Names, Google books
 Asteroids and comets rotation curves, CdR – Geneva Observatory, Raoul Behrend
 Discovery Circumstances: Numbered Minor Planets (1)-(5000) – Minor Planet Center
 
 

000855
Discoveries by Sergei Belyavsky
Named minor planets
19160403